Hans, Baron von Wangenheim (1859 – 26 October 1915) was a diplomat for Imperial Germany. He died of a stroke, diagnosed most likely as 'neurasthenic' tendencies.

Life 
Hans von Wangenheim was a German noble born in Gotha, where he was educated at the Ernestine Gymnasium. In 1902 he married Johanna Freiin von Spitzemberg (1877–1960), the daughter of Carl, Baron von Spitzemberg and Hildegard Baroness von Spitzemberg, née Freiin von Varnbüler.

He served abroad as:
 First Secretary at the embassy in Constantinople 1899–1904
 Minister to Mexico 1904–1908
 Chargé d'affaires in Tangier 1908
 Minister in Athens 1909–1912
 Ambassador to the Ottoman Empire 1912–1915. By October 1915 he was replaced by Ernst II, Prince of Hohenlohe-Langenburg.

He died on 26 October 1915 in Constantinople. Rumors were that he had been poisoned.

War 
With the outbreak of World War I, Wangenheim was instrumental in securing the entry of the Ottoman Empire into the war as part of the Central Powers. Wangenheim oversaw Max von Oppenheim's successful attempt to get the Ottoman Caliph Mehmed V to declare Jihad against the Triple Entente. During the time of the Armenian genocide there were accusations of German complicity and questions were raised as to Wangenheim's position of 'non-intervention'; the American ambassador to the Ottoman Empire, Henry Morgenthau, in his book Ambassador Morgenthau's Story (1918) would virulently criticise Wangenheim's role. In an interview with an American journalist, Wangenheim stated: "I do not blame the Turks for what they are doing to the Armenians ... They are entirely justified".

Also in Turkey at that time was the socialist revolutionary, arms dealer, and German agent Alexander Parvus. Wangenheim sent Parvus to Berlin in March 1915 endorsing Parvus' plan that Germany back the Bolsheviks against the Russian Empire.

Russian Statesman Sergey Sazonov regarded Wangenheim as "the most successful of the German fighting diplomatists".

References

External links
 

1859 births
1915 deaths
Barons of Germany
Ambassadors of Germany to Mexico
German people of World War I
Ambassadors of Germany to Turkey
Witnesses of the Armenian genocide
Ambassadors of Germany to Argentina
Ambassadors of Germany to Greece